Boris Borisovich Melnikov (16 May 1938 – 5 February 2022) was a Russian fencer. He won a gold medal in the team sabre event at the 1964 Summer Olympics. 

Melnikov died in Saint Petersburg on 5 February 2022, at the age of 83.

References

External links

1938 births
2022 deaths
Communist Party of the Soviet Union members
Sportspeople from Saint Petersburg
Russian male fencers
Soviet male fencers
Fencers at the 1964 Summer Olympics
Honoured Masters of Sport of the USSR
Medalists at the 1963 Summer Universiade
Medalists at the 1964 Summer Olympics
Olympic fencers of the Soviet Union
Olympic gold medalists for the Soviet Union
Olympic medalists in fencing
Universiade bronze medalists for the Soviet Union
Universiade medalists in fencing